Ervin Holpert (April 22, 1986 in Šabac, SR Serbia, Yugoslavia) is a Serbian sprint canoer.

He won a bronze medal in the K-4 1000 m event at the 2012 Canoe Sprint European Championships in Zagreb.

Holpert also competing in the K-4 1000 m event at the 2012 Summer Olympics in London. He is an ethnic Hungarian.

References

 Biography
EC bronze medal 
Hungarian source

External links
 
 
 
 

1986 births
Living people
Sportspeople from Šabac
Serbian male canoeists
Olympic canoeists of Serbia
Canoeists at the 2012 Summer Olympics
European Games competitors for Serbia
Canoeists at the 2015 European Games
Mediterranean Games silver medalists for Serbia
Mediterranean Games bronze medalists for Serbia
Competitors at the 2013 Mediterranean Games
Competitors at the 2018 Mediterranean Games
Mediterranean Games medalists in canoeing